Washington's National Park Fund is a 501(c)(3) non-profit organization that serves as the official fund raising partner for Mount Rainier National Park, North Cascades National Park, and Olympic National Park in Washington state, United States. The Fund is governed by a voluntary board of directors. The Fund both solicits and accepts charitable contributions on behalf of the parks and distributes them under guidelines agreed to by both the park superintendents and the board of directors for the Fund. This relationship is governed by partnership agreements.

History
Originally incorporated in 1993, the Fund relinquished its independent, nonprofit status in 2003 to become an affiliate of the National Park Foundation. Washington's National Park Fund regained its own nonprofit status in 2006 and has operated independently from the National Park Foundation since March 1, 2007.

2008
In 2008, the Fund donated $250,000 for Washington's parks.

At Mount Rainier National Park:
$100,000 to Solar Panel Array at Ohanapecosh Ranger Station and Storm and Flood Damage Recovery Work.
	
At North Cascades National Park:
$60,500 to Create the Junior Ranger Program, Design and Build Diablo Lake Overlook Interpretive Center, Create "Cascades for Kids" Corner in the Newhalem Visitor Center, Botany Forays and the Teacher to Ranger to Teacher Program.

At Olympic National Park:
$95,000 to Comprehensive Education Program on Elwha River and Elwha Dam Removal Project and Fisher Reintroduction Monitoring and Education.

2009
In 2009, the Fund donated more than $200,000 to the parks:

At Mount Rainier National Park:
$72,614.55 to CAMP - Camping Adventure with My Parents, Connecting Kids to Parks, Paradise Meadow Restoration and Volunteer Outreach.

At North Cascades National Park:
$55,000 to Volunteer Shelter at Marblemount, Botanical Forays and Landbird Inventory & Monitoring.

At Olympic National Park:
$72,621.94 to Study & Protect Roosevelt Elk, Monitor Fisher Restoration and Assess & Conserve Olympic Marmot Populations.

Today
Current fund raising efforts focus on the Centennial Initiative of the National Park Service (which celebrates its 100th Anniversary in 2016) and priority projects from each of the park partners, identified in collaboration with the superintendents. These include initiatives that address global climate change in the Pacific Northwest, the Climate Friendly Parks Program, projects to protect and preserve the natural and cultural resources of the parks, and special programs engage and enhance the visitor experience.

External links
Washington’s National Park Fund website
Centennial Initiative of the National Park Service
Climate Friendly Parks Program

Environmental organizations based in Washington (state)